Pietro Baseggio was a fourteenth-century architect and sculptor in Venice. In 1361, he was named superintendent of construction for the Doge's palace, and helped in construction along with Filippo Calendario.

References
John Ruskin. Stones of Venice.

14th-century Italian architects
14th-century Italian sculptors
Italian male sculptors
Republic of Venice architects
Gothic architects